Kovilage Anton Vijaya Kumaranatunga (9 October 1945 – 16 February 1988), popularly known as Vijaya Kumaratunga, was a Sri Lankan film actor, playback singer and a politician. Regarded as one of the most popular icons in Sri Lankan cinema of all time. He was married to former Sri Lankan President Chandrika Kumaranatunga from 1978 until his assassination in 1988. He was the Founder of Sri Lanka Mahajana Party.

Early life 
He was born on October 9, 1945, at the government hospital in Ragama to Roman Catholic parents.   His father was Kovilage Benjamin Kumaratunga, a village headmen and mother was Clara Beatrice Perera. Vijaya had three brothers and sisters: Sydney Kumaratunga, Vivian Kumaratunga and Rupa Kumaratunga. He received his primary education at Seeduwa Davisamara Maha Vidyalaya, secondary education at St. Benedict's College, Kotahena and De Mazenod College, Kandana. During his school days, he excelled at singing, drama and oratory. Following his schooling, Kumaratunga joined the Ceylon Police Force as a Sub Inspector, but left soon after.

Film career 
He first appears in a lead role as a university student named Bandu in the 1969 blockbuster Hanthane Kathawa directed by Sugathapala Senarath Yapa. But according to local film historians, the first time he acted in front of a camera was in the film Manamalayo three years ago. Although a Romeo and Juliet story was made in 1969, he was not the lead actor.

In a career that spanned nearly two decades, he contributed to more than 120 films, 114 of which starred the protagonist. Some of the most popular films include Ahas Gauwa (1974), Eya Den Loku Lamayek (1975), Ponmani (1977), Bambaru Avith (1977), Ganga Addara (1980), Baddegama (1980), Paradige (1980), Maha Gedara (1980), Kedapathaka Chaya (1989), and Kristhu Charithaya (1990). He acted in one English-language film, The God King, and one Tamil film, Nanguram. Meanwhile, the Vijaya-Malini era also came to the fore when he became the dream boy in the 1980s Sinhala cinema. According to the critic Gamini Weragama, Vijaya's performance in the film Maruwa Samaga Wase is close to Toshiro Mifune's supernatural role in Rashomon.

He also performed as a playback singer in several films; recorded more than 100 songs; and produced two films, Waradata Danduwam and Samawa which was released after his death. From 1983 to 1988 (once after the assassination) he was a consistently popular actor at six Sarasaviya Award Ceremonies. But he received the award for the Best Actor only for the role in Kedapathaka Chaya at the OCIC and the Swarna Sankha Festival in 1989, but he was not fortunate enough to see it. After two years of demise, he won the Sarasaviya Award for Best Playback singer for his song 'Walakulak Gena Muwa Karumu Hiru' for Saharawe Sihiniya and his song 'Sara Guwana Vida Neguna' for the Dolos Mahe Pahana. The only proof that he turned to singing as well as songwriting is the song 'Mulu Hadinma Oba Hata Adarei'.

Political career 
In 1974, Kumaratunga started his political career in the Lanka Sama Samaja Party (LSSP). He later joined the Sri Lanka Freedom Party (SLFP) and became its vice chairman.

In 1977, he ran unsuccessfully for the Katana seat in Parliament. Five years later, he was active in the 1982 presidential campaign of Hector Kobbekaduwa. After the election, he was accused of being a Naxalite and jailed under the emergency regulations of President J. R. Jayewardene, but he was never charged.

He ran as the SLFP candidate in a by-election in Mahara in 1983 and was threatened by United National Party (UNP) supporters. An attempt was made on his life, and one of his friends was killed. Kumaratunga won the first vote count, and a recount was ordered. At that point, a blackout occurred at the counting centre. By the time electricity was restored, the UNP candidate had recorded a victory by a few votes. The opposition alleged that someone had "eaten some of Vijaya's votes to ensure UNP victory".

On 22 January 1984 he founded the Sri Lanka Mahajana Party (SLMP) and became its first national organizer, which campaigned for peace in the Sri Lankan Civil War. Under his new party, he contested a Minneriya by-election and finished second, behind the UNP candidate—relegating his old party, SLFP, to third place. The SLMP went on to contest several other by-elections, including in Kundasale and Habaraduwa, but did not live up to expectations.

in 1986, Kumaranatunga visited Jaffna, then controlled by the Liberation Tigers of Tamil Eelam (LTTE). He visited the Nallur Murugan Temple and met with local Tamil civilians, as well as several LTTE youth leaders.

In his final public address, to a large crowd in Colombo's Campbell Park on 28 January 1988, Kumaratunga lashed out at the UNP, SLFP, and Janatha Vimuthki Peramuna (JVP) parties for failing to address the needs of the hour. He also voiced concerns about the SLFP's links with the JVP, a Marxist–Leninist party involved in two armed uprisings against the Sri Lankan government.

In 1988, the SLMP reached an agreement with several other left-wing parties—including the LSSP, Nava Sama Samaja Party (NSSP), Sri Lanka Communist Party, and Eelam People's Revolutionary Liberation Front (EPRLF)—to form the United Socialist Alliance (USA). A few days prior to the establishment of the new alliance, Kumaranatunga was assassinated. The agreement was signed by party leaders at his funeral.

The USA won a large number of seats in the newly formed provincial councils in an election boycotted by the main opposition SLFP. However, in the 1988 presidential election, the USA candidate, Ossie Abeygunasekera, finished in last place. In the 1989 parliamentary elections, USA candidates won three seats, but none of the winners represented the SLMP.

Personal life 
On 20 February 1978, Kumaratunga married Chandrika Bandaranaike, with whom he had two children. Bandaranaike was the daughter of two former prime ministers, S. W. R. D. Bandaranaike and Sirimavo Bandaranaike, and would later become president of Sri Lanka.

Death and legacy 

Kumaratunga was shot in the head with a Type 56 assault rifle outside his home on the outskirts of Colombo on 16 February 1988 by Lionel Ranasinghe, alias Gamini. Ranasinghe confessed to the murder under questioning by the Criminal Investigation Department. In a 141-page statement, he said he had been carrying out orders given to him by the Deshapremi Janatha Viyaparaya (Patriotic People's Movement), the military arm of the JVP, which was responsible for multiple assassinations in the late 1980s. After Chandrika Kumaratunga became President in 1994, she appointed a Presidential Commission of Inquiry which inquired in to the assassination, its report alleged that President Ranasinghe Premadasa of the UNP and two government ministers were behind the Kumaranatunga assassination without any direct evidence.

Kumaratunga's funeral, on 21 February 1988, attracted huge crowds and was the first funeral to be broadcast live on Sri Lankan television (by the Sri Lanka Rupavahini Corporation). It was held at Independence Square in Colombo as a state funeral, even though he represented the opposition to the UNP government. The day of his assassination is widely known as "The Horrible Tuesday" or "The Darkest Tuesday in Sri Lankan History" (He was assassinated on a Tuesday). His death is still mourned by many people in Sri Lanka.

Filmography

Electoral history

See also 
 List of political families in Sri Lanka

References

External links 
 Vijaya Kumaranatunga All Sinhala Mp3 Songs
 

1945 births
1988 deaths
20th-century Sri Lankan male actors
20th-century Sri Lankan male singers
Assassinated Sri Lankan politicians
Deaths by firearm in Sri Lanka
Lanka Sama Samaja Party politicians
People murdered in Sri Lanka
Sinhalese male actors
Sinhalese singers
Sinhalese police officers
Sri Lanka Mahajana Pakshaya politicians
Sri Lankan actor-politicians
Sri Lankan male film actors
Sri Lankan Roman Catholics
Alumni of De Mazenod College	
Alumni of St. Benedict's College, Colombo